Eashwar Mime Co. is a Hindi drama film directed and produced by Shyamanand Jalan based on Dibyendu Palit's short story, Mukabhinoy. This film was released on 26 November 2005 under the banner of National Film Development Corporation. Though the movie did not receive a commercial release, it was screened at Durban International Film Festival, the 3 Continents Festival and the Kolkata Film Festival.

Plot

This is the story of a megalomaniac mime director named Eashwar. He is the owner, manager and director of Eashwar Mime Co.

Cast
 Vijay Tendulkar
 Ashish Vidyarthi as Eashwar
 Pawan Malhotra as Chitrarth Roy
 Prem Prakash Modi

References

External links
 

2005 films
2000s Hindi-language films
2005 drama films
Indian drama films
Films with screenplays by Vijay Tendulkar
Films based on Indian novels
Films based on short fiction
Hindi-language drama films